Tauriello is a surname. Notable people with the surname include:

 Anthony F. Tauriello (1899–1983), American politician and attorney
 Dena Tauriello, drummer 
 Joseph A. Tauriello (1934–2009), politician 
 Pete Tauriello, traffic reporter

Italian-language surnames